Sybrand is a masculine given name. Notable people with the name include:

Sybrand Engelbrecht (cricketer) (born 1988), South African cricketer
Sybrand Engelbrecht (soldier) (1913–1994), South African Army general
Sybrand van Haersma Buma (born 1965), Dutch politician

Masculine given names
Dutch given names
Afrikaans-language given names